The State Agrarian University of Moldova (UASM) is a university located in Chişinău, Moldova. It was founded in 1933.

Organization
The State Agrarian University of Moldova (SAUM) is the only higher agricultural education institution in the Republic of Moldova and the first higher education institution founded in Chişinău. SAUM has a history that began on 9 April 1933, when King Carol II of Romania promulgated the Law concerning the transformation of Agricultural Sciences Section of the University of Iaşi into the Faculty of Agricultural Sciences with its center in Chişinău. In 1938, the institution was renamed the Faculty of Agronomy and became administratively part of the newly established Gheorghe Asachi Polytechnic School.

In 1940, following the occupation of Bessarabia by the Soviet Union, the faculty from Chișinău became an independent institution as the Chișinău Agricultural Institute, with four faculties (from 1944): Agronomy, Viticulture, Horticulture, and Animal Sciences. Other faculties are established over time: Mechanization of Agriculture (1950), Land Improvements (1954), Agrarian Economics (1965), Veterinary Medicine (1976). In 1991, the name of the institution was changed to the State Agrarian University of Moldova.

At present, SAUM has over 6,000 undergraduate and postgraduate students trained in 23 specialties, 30 specializations, and 27 scientific specialties, respectively.

Gallery

Notable alumni
Avigdor Lieberman, Israel's former foreign minister
Igor Dodon, Moldova's fifth president
Mircea Snegur, Moldova's first president
Andrei Sangheli, Moldova's prime-minister during 1992-1997

See also
 List of universities in Moldova
 Education in Moldova

References

External links
 www.uasm.md 

Educational institutions established in 1933
Education in Chișinău
Buildings and structures in Chișinău
Universities in Moldova
1933 establishments in Romania